Ancelmo de Holanda Bessa Júnior (born 3 April 1990) is a Brazilian professional football player who most recently played for Treze as an attacking midfielder.

Career
Born in Rio Branco, Júnior is a youth prospect of Independência and Rio Branco, which he later debuted in the Campeonato Paulista. He then changed teams often, representing five in less than 2 years.

Júnior had a try-out at Atlético Paranaense in February 2013, but was not offered a contract. He had a short spell at Galícia and played briefly in Brazilian second tier for Bragantino in May 2014.

On 19 July 2014, Júnior joined Boavista in Portuguese first tier, but played only seven games across two seasons, being released on 30 May 2016.

Ancelmo Júnior signed for Treze for the 2021 season. He was released from his contract on 28 April 2021.

Notes

References

External links

1990 births
Living people
People from Rio Branco, Acre
Brazilian footballers
Association football defenders
Rio Branco Esporte Clube players
Guarani FC players
Mixto Esporte Clube players
Esporte Clube XV de Novembro (Piracicaba) players
Galícia Esporte Clube players
Clube Atlético Bragantino players
Clube Atlético Metropolitano players
Boavista F.C. players
Rio Branco Football Club players
Associação Atlética de Altos players
Moto Club de São Luís players
Treze Futebol Clube players
Primeira Liga players
Campeonato Brasileiro Série B players
Campeonato Brasileiro Série C players
Campeonato Brasileiro Série D players
Brazilian expatriate footballers
Expatriate footballers in Portugal
Brazilian expatriate sportspeople in Portugal
Sportspeople from Acre (state)